Kaitlin Colombo is an American stand-up comedian, television personality, writer, and actress. She is perhaps best known for her brief but noteworthy audition for NBC's reality series Last Comic Standing where she was named "Online Fan Favorite" the first week. She is also known for her stand-up comedy work in the field of gay rights activism.

Stand-up comedy career
Colombo began her stand-up comedy career at the unusual age of 13. Her blonde, girl-next-door looks and precocious personality earned her the nickname "The Lolita of Comedy" from fellow comedian Jay Mohr at her inaugural stand-up performance.

The daughter of a gay man and a lesbian, Colombo has long been an activist for gay rights and assorted gay rights issues. To that end, she has been a featured stand-up performer on Rosie O'Donnell's R Family Vacations cruise lines, has headlined across the country at various Gay Pride events and has written for Edge Publications.

Television appearances
Colombo appeared in the brief-lived MTV series The Reality Show, hosted by comedian Andy Dick. Following her stint on this program, she auditioned for Last Comic Standing. While Colombo was not accepted into the show's cast, her popularity among home and Internet viewers earned her a place in the show's "Last Comic Downloaded" web competition. Colombo succeeded in winning the initial round of the online competition—whose goal was a live performance at the finale of the Last Comic Standing season—but ultimately lost to comedians Theo Von and Josh Wolf.

Colombo can be seen on various talk shows airing on the E! Network. She provides humorous commentary and banter in these shows, along with fellow comics and writers.

Writing
Colombo is an accomplished writer and director, having optioned her first screenplay at 14.

When she was 17, she wrote a sitcom pilot entitled "The Voices Inside My Head".  Based on her observations about the comical and oftentimes overwhelming impact pop culture has on young girls, her script also told of her experiences being raised by a single gay father.  Executive Produced by director Doug Liman and producer Dave Bartis, the pilot sold to Fox Broadcasting Company.

References

External links
Website

21st-century American comedians
21st-century American women
American bloggers
American stand-up comedians
American television personalities
American women bloggers
American women comedians
American women television personalities
American LGBT rights activists
Living people
Year of birth missing (living people)